The Union of Baptists in Belgium is a Baptist Christian denomination in Belgium. It is affiliated with the Baptist World Alliance.

History
The union has its origins in a French Baptist mission in Ougrée in 1895. It was officially founded in 1922. According to a denomination census released in 2020, it claimed 31 churches and 1,505 members.

External links
Official web site

References

Christian organizations established in 1922
Baptist denominations in Europe
Baptist denominations established in the 20th century
Protestantism in Belgium